David Van (born 14 November 1964) is an Australian politician. He is a member of the Liberal Party of Australia and was sworn in to the Australian Senate on 1 July 2019, as a Senator for  Victoria.

Early life
Van has an undergraduate degree in horticulture, and as part of his degree studied the regeneration of Australian bush post the Ash Wednesday fires in the Blackwood forest that was burned as part of the Trentham East fire complex.

Career
Prior to entering politics, Van was the managing director of South Melbourne public relations firm the De Wintern Group since 2003 where he advised clients on Royal Commissions and other Government inquiries. He was a board director of the Australian Association of Franchisees. A St Kilda resident, he was also the co-convenor of neighbourhood group Friends of St Kilda Hill, which was outspoken about crime and safety, specifically in relation to the Gatwick Hotel boarding house and public housing.

Van holds a Masters degree in International Relations from Monash University.

Politics

Van was elected to the Senate at the 2019 federal election from the marginal third position on the Liberal ticket. He was assigned a party role as "patron" for the Labor-held House seat of Dunkley. In his first speech in September 2019, Van spoke of his belief in the "dignity of work", defended the coalition government's welfare policies, and stated that he believed in "free markets, freedom of speech, and most importantly in my view, getting government out of people's lives to the most practicable extent possible".

Van has worked to ensure projects of national significance such as the 310 St Kilda Rd project are properly maintained, after using Senate Estimates to question the Department of Defence on the state of disrepair the site was in which helped prompt a government review.

In 2020 and 2021, Van advocated for the LAND 8116 self-propelled artillery project contract to be awarded to Hanwha, who would build 30 self-propelled howitzers and 15 armoured ammunition resupply vehicles for the army in Geelong, Victoria.

In February 2021, Van called for an independent review into ABC complaints.

In November 2021, then Prime Minister Scott Morrison said he was "disappointed" after claims that Van had made "growling and dog noises" at Senator Jacqui Lambie spoke during Senate Question Time, on the same day as the Sex Descrimination Commissioner released a report into harassment and workplace culture at Parliament House. Van later "apologised unreservedly" for interjecting but denied making "growling noises".

As Chair of the Parliamentary friends of Ukraine, Van has been a proponent for providing support for Ukraine, regularly raising Ukraine’s need for Australian support and the geopolitical impact of the war in Parliament and attending several rallies with the Ukrainian community.

As of early 2022, Van is a member of several committees including the Joint Standing Committees for Trade & Investment Growth and Treaties, as well as Senate Select Committee for Foreign Interference through Social Media, Senate Committee on Environment & Communication and Legal & Constitutional Affairs.

Van is a member of the centre-right faction of the Liberal Party.

References

External links
 https://www.liberal.org.au/member/david-van

1964 births
Living people
Liberal Party of Australia members of the Parliament of Australia
Members of the Australian Senate
Members of the Australian Senate for Victoria